Joan of Arc of Mongolia is a 1989 West German drama film directed by Ulrike Ottinger. It was entered into the 39th Berlin International Film Festival. In 2017, it screened for a week at the Museum of Modern Art.

Cast
In alphabetical order
 Badema
 Lydia Billiet
 Christoph Eichhorn as Officer's attache
 Sevimbike Elibay as 3. Mitglied der Kalinka Sisters
 Amadeus Flössner
 Irm Hermann as Secondary-school teacher Mueller-Vohwinkel
 Xu Re Huar as Princess Ulan Iga
 Jacinta as 1. Mitglied der Kalinka Sisters
 Peter Kern as Mickey Katz
 Else Nabu as 2. Mitglied der Kalinka Sisters
 Mark Reeder
 Inés Sastre as Giovanna
 Gillian Scalici as Fanny Ziegfeld
 Delphine Seyrig as Lady Windermere
 Nugzar Sharia as Russian officer
 Shurenhuar as a Mongolian princess
 Marek Szmielkin

References

External links

1989 films
1989 drama films
German drama films
West German films
1980s German-language films
Films directed by Ulrike Ottinger
Films set on the Trans-Siberian Railway
Films set in Mongolia
1980s German films